Aksel Brehm (also Aksel Preem; 1889 – ?) was an Estonian politician, born in Rapla. He was a member of I Riigikogu, representing the Estonian Independent Socialist Workers' Party. He was a member of the assembly since 15 December 1921. He replaced Aleksander Prass. On 16 December 1921, he resigned his position and he was replaced by Karl Ellis.

References

1889 births
Year of death missing
Estonian Independent Socialist Workers' Party politicians
Members of the Riigikogu, 1920–1923
People from Rapla